Arora is an Indian community from the Punjab region. Arora may also refer to:
 Arora (surname)
 ARORA (vocal group)
 Uttradhi Arora, major subgroup of the Arora social caste in India
 Arora (web browser), a free and open source lightweight cross-platform web browser

See also 
 List of Aroras, a list of famous people of the Arora caste of the Punjab and Sindh
 Aror, former name of Rohri in Sindh, Pakistan
 Aurora (disambiguation)